Sidney John Clewlow (8 November 1919 – 1989) was a footballer who played in the Football League for New Brighton, Wolverhampton Wanderers and guested for Stoke City. He also guested for Aberdeen during the Second World War.

Career statistics
Source:

References

English footballers
Aberdeen F.C. wartime guest players
New Brighton A.F.C. players
Wolverhampton Wanderers F.C. players
Stoke City F.C. wartime guest players
English Football League players
1989 deaths
1919 births
Association football wing halves
Grimsby Town F.C. players
Royal Air Force personnel of World War II